Bloque is the Spanish language word for Bloc and may refer to:

Bloque Meta, Colombian drug trafficking, neo-paramilitary organization
Bloque De Armas, Venezuelan media company which owns the newspapers Diario 2001 and Diario Meridiano
El Bloque de Oro, "The Golden Block," neighborhood in the North Philadelphia section of the city of Philadelphia
Communist Workers Bloc of Andalusia (redirect from Bloque Obrero Comunista de Andalucía) 
Galician Nationalist Bloc (redirect from Bloque Nacionalista Galego) 
Bloque, (es) a Spanish band 1973–2000, which played Sfinks Festival in 1999
Bloque, a Colombian band signed to Luaka Bop

See also
Bloc (disambiguation)
French word meaning "blocked":
"Bloqué", a song by French hip hop duo Casseurs Flowters, 2013